Oldham Metropolitan Borough Council, branded and commonly referred to as Oldham Council, is the local authority of the Metropolitan Borough of Oldham in Greater Manchester, England. It is a metropolitan district council, one of ten in Greater Manchester and one of 36 in the metropolitan counties of England, and provides the majority of local government services in Oldham. It is composed of 60 councillors, three for each of the 20 electoral wards of the borough.

The council is controlled by the Labour Party, the leader of the council is Amanda Chadderton who has been in post since May 2022. The primary opposition parties are the Liberal Democrats and the Conservative Party, along with the Failsworth Independents Party and two independent members.

Many, but not all, of the council's staff are based at Oldham Civic Centre in the town centre.

History
Oldham Council is a metropolitan borough of Greater Manchester, England. The borough is named after its largest town, Oldham, but also includes the towns of Chadderton, Failsworth, Royton and Shaw and Crompton, the village of Lees, and the parish of Saddleworth.

The borough was formed in 1974 as part of the provisions of the Local Government Act 1972.  It is an amalgamation of the former County Borough of Oldham with the Chadderton, Crompton, Lees, Royton urban districts of Lancashire and the Saddleworth Urban District of the West Riding of Yorkshire.

For its first 12 years, the borough had a two-tier system of local government: Oldham Council sharing power with the Greater Manchester County Council.

Since the Local Government Act 1985, Oldham Council has effectively been a unitary authority, serving as the sole executive, deliberative and legislative body responsible for local policy, setting council tax, and allocating budget in the district. 
The Metropolitan Borough of Oldham has two civil parishes and 20 electoral wards.
The parish councils are involved in planning, management of town and parish centres, and promoting tourism. In 2001, 46,072 people lived in Oldham's two civil parishes—Saddleworth and Shaw and Crompton—20.9% of the borough's population. The rest of the borough is unparished.

Since 2011 Oldham is one of the ten-member authorities of the Greater Manchester Combined Authority (GMCA) which is a top tier local authority with responsibility for Transport, Health, Housing and Economic matters. The membership of the Combined Authority is drawn from the Leaders or Executive Mayors of each of the ten councils.

In 2011, Oldham declared its ambition to become a Co-operative Council, which it describes as "one where citizens, partners and staff work together to improve the borough and create a confident and ambitious place...Put simply, becoming a co-operative borough is about everybody doing their bit and everybody benefitting."

An early progress report by the RSA thinktank in 2012 said Co-operative principles could help councils manage and reduce demand for services and create ‘a sustainable economic and social future’.

Oldham leads the national Co-operative Councils Innovation Network – a group of local authorities who say they are committed to finding better ways of for, and with, their local communities.

Oldham Youth Council, formed in 2006, now has constitutional power on Oldham Council – a national first. The Youth Council is democratically elected every two years via a borough-wide election run in schools, colleges and youth organisations. The group now has its own section on the agenda of each meeting of Full Council at Oldham Council where it can raise and debate issues and hold councillors to account.

In mid-September 2020, Oldham Council announced that it had acquired the shopping centre "the spindles" with the intent of renovating the shopping centre and local market grounds.

Honours
The council can confer the title of Honorary Alderman of the Borough on persons who have, in the opinion of the council, rendered "eminent services" to it as a past member. Recipients to date are Ralph Semple, Ellen Brierley, Jack Armitage, George Edmond Lord, Sidney GW Jacobs, David Roger Jones, Christine Wheeler and Richard David Knowles.

The Freedom of the Borough is the highest honour the council can bestow. It is awarded rarely and dates back to the Middle Ages when freemen had commercial privileges and route into a position of power in a town or city. Associated with this is a ‘freedom of entry’ which the council can award to service units that have "rendered conspicuous service" and are closely associated with the borough. Freedom of entry grants the service unit the right, privilege and honour of marching through the streets of Oldham on ceremonial occasions with swords drawn, bayonets fixed, drums beating, bands playing and colours flying.

Recipients to date are: Dame Sarah Anne Lees, Dr Thomas Fawsitt, Alderman William Schofield, Charles Ward, Marjory Lees, Rt Hon Winston Leonard Spencer Churchill, Rt Hon JR Clynes, William E Freeman, James Bannon, Alderman Frank Tweedale, Thomas Driver, Alderman John Fletcher Waterhouse, the 41st (Oldham) Royal Tank Regiment TA, Sir William Turner Walton, Alice Amelia Kenyon, Charles Leslie Hale, Sir Frank lord, Dame Eva Turner, Arnold Tweedale, 75 Engineer Regiment (Volunteers), Honorary Alderman Miss Ellen Brierley, Sir Norman Kelvin Stoller and Michael Hugh Meacher MP.

Political makeup

The most recent elections took place in May 2022.  the political makeup of the council is:

 Labour Group – 35 members 
 Liberal Democrat Group – 9 members 
 Conservative Group – 9 members 
 Failsworth Independent Party - 5 members
 Independents – 2 members

Amanda Chadderton has been leader of Oldham Council since May 2022. Previous leaders Arooj Shah and Sean Fielding lost their seats whilst serving as leader, each after one year in office.

Coat of arms/motto
The borough's coat of arms is based on the crest of the former Oldham County Borough and includes within it symbols to identify the other six districts that make up the Borough. These are the former urban districts of Chadderton, Crompton, Failsworth, Lees, Royton and Saddleworth.

The Shield is derived from the former arms of Oldham showing three white owls (a pun on "Owldham") and three red rings giving the initial letter "0".

Above it is the closed helm proper to Civic arms with its twisted crest-wreath and decorative mantling. Upon the wreath stands the Crest. The owl is shown on its rock rising from a gold circlet charged with the three red rings from the shield.

The two red griffins identify the other districts by the heraldry of their chief manorial families which are some of the most famous in history. They include the Chaddertons (connected with Chadderton, Failsworth, Crompton and Lees) and the Chethams (connected with Crompton). Both families are branches of the de Traffords whose red griffin is also seen at Eccles and elsewhere. As a necessary difference, they wear collars with fluted edges like those in the arms of the Radcliffes (Oldham, Royton and Chadderton). On the collars are the three red "bendlets" on white, of the arms of the Byrons (Failsworth, Crompton and Royton).

From each collar hangs a white heptagon symbolic of the united seven authorities. On the left one is the black "mullet" of the Asshetons (Oldham and Chadderton) and on the right Saddleworth is represented by a black saddle in reference to the name of its derivation – a settlement on a saddle-shaped ridge.

The Oldham Council motto "Sapere Aude" means "dare to be wise" with the word "Aude" containing the syllable "Owd" of the local pronunciation of "Owdham" or "Owldham."

Youth Mayor

Oldham Council introduced the office of Youth Mayor in 2009 when Mohammed Adil became the first-ever holder of the post. The post was the idea of – and is chosen by – members of the Oldham Youth Council.

He has since been followed as Youth Mayor by:

 Liam Turner 2010–2011
 Chantel Birtwistle 2011–2012
 Joshua Payne 2012–2013
 Emma O’Donnell 2013-2004
 Daisy Murphy 2014–2015
 Saskia Edwards-Korolczuk 2015–2016
 T-Jay Turner 2016–2017
 Mohammed Marouf Ahmed 2017–2018
 Amber Powell 2018–

Wards
Oldham Council has 20 electoral wards across its six districts of Chadderton, Failsworth and Hollinwood, Oldham, Royton, Shaw and Crompton, and Saddleworth and Lees.

These are: 
 Alexandra
 Chadderton Central
 Chadderton North
 Chadderton South
 Coldhurst
 Crompton
 Failsworth East
 Failsworth West 
 Hollinwood
 Medlock Vale
 Royton North
 Royton South
 Saddleworth North
 Saddleworth South
 Saddleworth West and Lees
 St James
 St Mary’s 
 Shaw
 Waterhead
 Werneth

Notable recent achievements
 Oldham’s ‘Bloom and Grow’ campaigns have seen it win the ‘Best City’ category four years running at the North West in Bloom competition up to 2013. It has also represented the region at the national Britain in Bloom in the same category and won the ‘Best City’ gong in 2012.  
 Oldham was ‘Most Improved Council’ at the Local Government Chronicle awards in 2012. 
 Jean Stretton was named ‘Community Champion of the Year’ and councillors Amanda Chadderton, Sean Fielding and Arooj Shah jointly won ‘Young Councillor of the Year’ awards in 2013. 
 Council Leader, Jim McMahon was named ‘Leader of the Year’ at the C’llr Achievement Awards in February 2014.
 Oldham was ‘highly commended’ at the LGC Council of the Year awards for the top prize in 2014.
First Female Muslim Council Leader Arooj Shah 2021

See also
Oldham local elections

References

Metropolitan district councils of England
Local authorities in Greater Manchester
Leader and cabinet executives
Local education authorities in England
Billing authorities in England
1974 establishments in England
Council